Big FM is a German radio network that consists of three regional radio stations: bigFM Der Neue Beat in Baden-Württemberg, bigFM Hot Music Radio in Rhineland-Palatinate and bigFM Saarland in Saarland. The format is Rhythmic CHR, and the network specialises in pop, rock, dance, hip-hop and rap. Talk shows are also featured late at night that mainly focuses on young people's issues and stories, and broadcast weeknights from midnight - 2 am (Nightlounge) and Sunday from 10:45 pm - midnight (Night Talk).

Frequencies
Today bigFM is the biggest private radio station for young people in Germany with 2.5 million weekly listeners. In addition, 11 million people are aware of the station's existence.

FM Stuttgart: 89.5
FM Rottweil: 99.0
FM Villingen-Schwenningen: 99.5
FM Cologne: 104.9
FM Frankfurt: 104.5
FM Koblenz: 104.0
FM Trier: 106.4
FM Eifel: 106.6
FM Karlsruhe: 105.2
FM Kaiserslautern: 107.6
FM Saarburg: 96.5
FM Pirmasens: 96.7
FM Baden-Baden: 103.8
FM Mannheim: 87.8
FM Heidelberg: 90.9
FM Sinsheim: 97.2
FM Ulm: 99.7
FM Freiburg: 102.8
FM Tübingen: 89.7
FM Heilbronn: 104.7
FM Aalen: 105.1
FM Göppingen: 100.3
FM Ludwigshafen: 106.7
FM Saarbrücken: 94.2
FM Merzig: 92.6
FM St. Ingbert: 96.8

Controversy 
The creators of bigFM had always been using practices that were rated by observers as nonsense or meaningless. In one case in 2016 this also led to a criticism of the national institute for communication Baden-Wuerttemberg at the marketing practice of the transmitter.

One of the station's most controversial actions took place in summer 2017. Breakfast DJ Rob Green attempted to send a WhatsApp message to Marlen Gröger, who he expected to be a newsreader for DASDING. Its content stated that if she could leave the studio immediately even when she was reading out the news on that station, she would get a job on "Germany's biggest morning show". That message was finally sent at 7:31am that day.

The message was as follows (originally in German):Hey Marlen, wenn du jetzt LIVE während deiner Nachrichten hinschmeißt, hab ich nen Job für dich in Deutschlands biggster Morningshow auf BigFM! Wir hören dich gerade!It turned out that the person who read the newscast at the time on DASDING was Athene Pi Permantier, not Marlen. In addition, Marlen had already finished her contract with DASDING for quite some time and was now working at BigFM.

The radio station's production team posted an image of the act as its proof, however it caused some major backlash, with Facebook users calling the act "fake news", "scam" and questioning the station's journalistic ethic. Moreover, Baden-Württemberg Foundation decided to cancel the media partnership with BigFM for an event against fake news, false reports and fake information. The radio station later issued an apology saying they were sorry for this cancellation, but assured it was completely about "introducing a new good journalist" alone, and argued that the term of "fake news" was highly questionable, since Rob Green's show was entertainment-oriented, not hard news-oriented. In the comment section under some of the event's reports, some users said the action was not good, but described the excitement as "exaggerated." It was also noted that Marlen Gröger could not read Rob's message whatsoever during the live newscast. After investigating this view was confirmed by the Landesanstalt für Kommunikation Baden-Württemberg (LFK). There is also no violation of the state media law. The LFK accused the media criticism website Übermedien.de for "mistakenly" reporting about the bigFM action.

Webradios 
In addition to the four main BigFM streams, BigFM also provides 22 webradios including:

 BigFM Charts
 BigFM Hip-Hop
 BigFM Dance
 BigFM Mashup
 BigFM Rock am Ring
 BigFM Sunset Lounge
 BigFM US Rap & Hip-Hop
 BigFM Oldschool Rap & Hip-Hop
 BigFM Deutschrap
 BigFM Deutscher Hip-Hop Charts
 BigFM Oldschool Deutschrap
 BigFM Groovenight
 BigFM Urban Club Beats
 BigFM World Beats
 BigFM NitroX EDM & Progressive
 BigFM NitroX Deep & Tech House
 BigFM Latin Beats
 BigFM Dancehall & Reggae Vibez
 BigBALKAN
 BigSES Türkei
 BigRUSSIA
 BigORIENT

References

External links
 Official bigFM cityclubbing Website
 bigKARRIERE - Job Information Board of BigFM (German)

Radio stations in Germany
Radio stations established in 2000